Guilt by Association Vol. 1 is a compilation album released September 4, 2007 by Engine Room Recordings. It features indie rock artists covering well-known pop and R&B songs.

Overview
Conceived and compiled by Engine Room Recordings, the album brings together a variety of artists in the indie music scene.

Engine Room Recordings held a music video contest in support of the album's release. The winner was Andy Cahill, and his video for Devendra Banhart's cover of the Oasis song "Don't Look Back in Anger" is available for viewing on YouTube and Engine Room Recordings' homepage.

On November 18, 2008, Engine Room released a sequel, Guilt by Association Vol. 2. The third installment of the series, Guilt by Association Vol. 3, was released on November 15, 2011.

Track listing

Critical reception

Harp Magazine has recognized the album, highlighting the juxtaposition between the independent nature of the cover artists and the mainstream popularity of the covered acts.

See also
Guilt by Association Vol. 2
Guilt by Association Vol. 3

References

External links
Official Myspace of GbA
Official website by Engine Room Recordings
Official Facebook fanpage

Engine Room Recordings albums
Covers albums
2007 compilation albums